Mack the Knife is a 1989 romantic comedy musical film written and directed by Menahem Golan, a film adaptation of the 1928 Brecht/Weill musical The Threepenny Opera. The film stars Raúl Juliá as Captain Macheath (reprising his Tony-nominated role from Richard Foreman 1974 revival of Opera), Richard Harris as Mr. Peachum, Julia Migenes as Jenny Diver, Julie Walters as Mrs. Peachum, and Roger Daltrey as the Street Singer. Brecht and Weill's score and libretto was adapted by Golan, Marc Blitzstein, and Dov Seltzer.

Plot
In 19th century London, young Polly Peachum falls for the famous womanizing criminal Macheath and they decide to get married, but because of her family's disapproval, her father ("the king of thieves") has Macheath arrested.

Cast
 Raúl Juliá as Macheath
 Richard Harris as Mr. Peachum
 Julia Migenes as Jenny Diver
 Roger Daltrey as The Street Singer
 Julie Walters as Mrs. Peachum
 Bill Nighy as "Tiger" Brown
 Rachel Robertson as Polly Peachum
 Clive Revill as Matthew "Money Matthew"
 Erin Donovan as Lucy Brown
 Louise Plowright as Dolly
 Elizabeth Seal as Molly
 Chrissie Kendall as Betty
 Mark Northover as Jimmy "Jewels"

Production
Juliá reprises the role of Macheath which won him a Tony nomination for a 1976 revival on Broadway. The film shows obvious signs of last minute editing, including several musical numbers that appear on the soundtrack album but are not in the final cut.

Home media
The film has never been released on DVD and as of April 2022, Sony Pictures Home Entertainment has yet to announce any plans for a DVD or Blu-Ray release.

References

External links
 
 
 

1989 films
1980s crime comedy films
1989 romantic comedy films
Films set in the 19th century
Films set in London
Films about criminals
Dutch romantic comedy films
English-language Dutch films
Films directed by Menahem Golan
Dutch crime comedy films
Films based on musicals
Films based on works by Bertolt Brecht
Films shot in Budapest
Dutch independent films
1980s musical comedy films
1989 independent films
Films with screenplays by Menahem Golan
1980s English-language films